This is the list of current, upcoming and formerly broadcast series by the Indian television channel StarPlus.

Current broadcast

Re-runs

Former broadcast

Acquired series

Anthology series

Children/teen series

Comedy series

Drama series

Mythological series

International series

Baywatch (1997)
The Bold and the Beautiful (1997)
The Crystal Maze (1993–1994)
The Good Life (1998)
Mind Your Language (1997–1998)
Murder, She Wrote (1997–1998)
Rage of Angels (1993)
Remington Steele (1992–1993)
Riviera (1993)
Santa Barbara (1992–1994)
Small Wonder (1997–2004)
The Wonder Years (1992–1996)

Animated series

Bobby's World (2001)
Bonkers (2009)
The Book of Pooh (2009)
The Buzz on Maggie (2005–2006)
Dennis the Menace (2001–2003)
Disney's House of Mouse (2008)
Dungeons & Dragons (2001–2003)
Eek! the Cat (2001–2004)
Fantastic Four (2001–2004)
Fillmore! (2008–2009)
Iron Man (2001–2004)
Kim Possible (2005–2006)
Lilo & Stitch (2008–2009)
Little Einsteins (2008)
Mickey Mouse Clubhouse (2008)
The New Adventures of Winnie the Pooh (2008)
RoboCop: The Animated Series (2001–2004)
Samurai Pizza Cats (2001)
Silver Surfer (2001–2004)
TaleSpin (2005–2006)
The Tick (2001–2002)
Timon & Pumbaa (2005–2006)

Reality/non-scripted programming

5 Star Kitchen ITC Chef's Special (2020)
Aaj Ki Raat Hai Zindagi (2015–2016)
Aap Ki Kachehri (2008–2011)
Amul India Show (1996–1999)
Antakshari - The Great Challenge (2007)
Arre Deewano Mujhe Pehchano (2009)
Bakeman's Ooh La La (1997)
Bol Baby Bol (2002)
Chala Change Ka Chakkar (2008)
Chef Pankaj Ka Zayka (2011)
Chhote Ustaad (2008–2010)
Comedy Ka Maha Muqabala (2011)
Dance Champions (2017)
Dil Hai Hindustani (2017–2018)
Diwali Rishton Kii (2008)
Golden Divas Baatein With Badshah (2017)
Fast Track (2000)
Gurukul (2002)
Jeele Ye Pal (2011)
Hai Na Bolo Bolo (2003)
India Business Week (1996)
India's Next Superstars (2018)
India's Raw Star (2014)
Jadoo (2003–2004)
Jodee Kamaal Ki (2007)
Junior Masterchef Swaad Ke Ustaad (2013)
Just Dance (2011)
Kaboom (2005-2006)
Kaho Na Yaar Hai (2008)
Kamzor Kadi Kaun (2002)
Kaun Banega Crorepati (2000–2007)
Khelo Jeeto Jiyo (2009)
Khullja Sim Sim (2001–2005)
The Kiran Joneja Show (1998)
Kismey Kitnaa Hai Dum (2002)
Kuch Kar Dikhana Hai (2003)
Kudratnama (1998)
Kya Aap Paanchvi Pass Se Tez Hain? (2008)
Kya Masti Kya Dhuum (2001–2002)
Lip Sing Battle (2017)
Mad in India (2014)
Mahayatra - Rishton Ka Anokha Safar (2010)
MasterChef India (2010–2020)
Mera Star Superstar (2006)
Meri Saheli (2000)
Mind Games - Baazi Dimag Ki (2009–2010)
Mirch Masala (2000–2002)
Mum Tum Aur Hum (2005)
Mummy Ke Superstars (2009)
 Musafir Hoon Yaaron (2001–2004)
Music Ka Maha Muqqabla (2009–2010)
Nach Baliye (2007–2019)
Nach Baliye Shriman v/s Shrimati (2013)
Naam Reh Jaayega (2022)
Nikki Tonight (1995)
Perfect Bride (2009)
Ravivaar With Star Parivaar  (2022)
Rendezvous With Simi Garewal (1997–2002)
Rin Ek Do Teen (1997–1998)
Sabse Smart Kaun (2017)
Sacch Ka Saamna (2009)
Satyamev Jayate (2012–2014)
Shotgun Show (1999)
So Let's Yahoo (1998)
Smart Jodi (2022)
Star Sunday Lunch (2000)
Star Vivaah (2009)
Star Voice of India (2007–2010)
Sunday Tango (2003–2004)
Survivor India (2012)
TED Talks India Nayi Soch (2017, 2019)
Taare Zameen Par (2020–2021)
Tere Mere Beach Mein (2009)
 The Indian Express: 26/11 Stories of Strength
The Great Indian Laughter Challenge 5 (2017)
The Road Show (1996)
V People (1996–2005)
Voice of India – Mummy Ke Superstars (2009)
Wife Bina Life (2011)
Without Malice (1998)
Yatra (2002–2003)
Zara Nachke Dikha (2010)

Television films
Humko Ishq Ne Maara (1997)

References

External links

 Star Plus Shows  on Hotstar

S
S
Disney Star